Ancylobacter pratisalsi is a Gram-negative, aerobic and non-motile bacteria from the genus of Ancylobacter which has been isolated from rhizospheric soil of the plant Plantago winteri.

References

Hyphomicrobiales
Bacteria described in 2017